Erika Vikman (born 20 February 1993) is a Finnish singer and songwriter. Beginning her career as a Finnish tango singer, Vikman first received recognition after winning Tangomarkkinat in 2016. She later received further nationwide attention following the release of the single "Cicciolina" in 2020, which became her first top five hit in Finland. Her debut self-titled studio album was released the following year, and topped the charts in Finland.

Early life and education
Vikman was born on 20 February 1993 in Tampere. She later grew up in Lempäälä and Pori. Her mother was also a singer, who sang Finnish tango music and competed in Tangomarkkinat. She has a sister named Jennika, who also is a singer. Vikman began singing as a teenager, and won the girls' division in the 2008 Junior Tango Competition. She later also participated in the 2010 Tampere Springboard Competition.

Vikman attended Tampere Coeducational High School, and graduated with her upper secondary school diploma in 2013. Afterwards, she also studied pop-jazz vocals at Pirkanmaa Music College.

Career

2013–2019: Tango career and Tangomarkkinat 2016
Vikman began her professional career in 2013, after she was selected to be a contestant in season seven of the Finnish version of Idols. She was selected as one of the twelve finalists, and was later eliminated during the 7 November 2013 episode, placing ninth. She later was brought back as a wildcard on the 28 November episode, but was eliminated again that week, ultimately placing seventh.

Following her departure from Idols, Vikman established herself as a Finnish tango singer. She competed in Tangomarkkinat in 2015, where she finished in second place. Vikman later returned to the competition the following year and won, being crowned the Tango Queen of Finland for 2016. Following the competition, Vikman later signed with Sony Music, and released her first single with the label, "Ettei mee elämä hukkaan", in 2017. The song saw Vikman experimenting more with electropop music.

2020–present: "Cicciolina" and mainstream success
In 2020, Vikman signed with Warner Music Finland and was confirmed by Yle to be competing in Uuden Musiikin Kilpailu 2020, the Finnish national selection for the Eurovision Song Contest 2020. In the competition, she performed the song "Cicciolina", written about the Hungarian-Italian pornographic actress Ilona Staller, who performed under the stage name Cicciolina. Vikman competed in the competition final on 7 March 2020 in Tampere, where she placed second; she received the most votes from the Finnish public, but the professional jury ranked her only third. Despite only placing second, the song went on to become a hit in Finland, becoming her first top five single. Following the success of "Cicciolina", Vikman later released the follow-up single "Syntisten pöytä", which became her second top five hit, and later first number one radio hit. Also in 2020, Vikman placed third in season one of Masked Singer Suomi, competing as "The Wasp".

Vikman released her debut self-titled studio album in August 2021. The album went on to peak at number-one in Finland, becoming Vikman's first number-one album. In May 2022, it was announced that Vikman would appear in season thirteen of Vain elämää, the Finnish version of The Best Singers.

Personal life
From 2016 until 2020, Vikman was in a highly publicized relationship with Finnish musician Danny. The relationship was controversial due to their wide age gap, with Danny being 51 years Vikman's senior. They resided together in Kirkkonummi until their separation.

Discography

Albums

Singles

References

External links

1993 births
Living people
21st-century Finnish women singers
Finnish pop singers
Finnish tango musicians
People from Lempäälä
People from Pori
musicians from Tampere